| name = Nikhil
| pronunciation= Nick,Nikki, Nickolas
| gender = Male
| meaning = people of victory
| origin = [[Languages of India, Greek
| related names = Nikki, Nick, Nikita
}}

Nikhil Nick a male name of Indian,Greek origin. It is predominantly found in India,America ,europe Nepal, and the diaspora of these countries. The name means "people of victory" or "goodness".<ref>|url=https://www.thebump.com/b/niki-baby-name
saint Nicholas
<ref>|url=https://en.m.wikipedia.org/wiki/Saint_Nicholas
Nikhil name widely used in pan indian states Goa, Kerala, Mumbai and also kolkata
Word Nikhil means complete or whole in sanskrit . Name is popularly used in all religions in India Christianity, Hinduism, islaam

Notable people 

Nick Jonas, Singer, songwriter
Nikki Reed , actress
Nikki Haley , American politician 
Nikhil Paul George, British music producer, singer
Nikhil D'Souza singer, songwriter, Mumbai

Nikhil Chinapa , indian DJ
Nikhil Kumar (governor), Indian politician, Governor of Nagaland and of Kerala
Nikhil Advani, Hindi film director
Nikhil Banerjee (1931–1986), Indian classical sitar player
Nikhil Chopra, Indian cricketer
[[Nikhil 
Nikhil Dwivedi, Hindi actor and producer
Nikhil Kadam, Indian footballer Nikhil Kashyap
Nikhil Kanetkar, Indian Olympic badminton player
Nikhil Nanda, Indian industrialist
Nikhil Rathi, British chief executive of the UK's Financial Conduct Authority
Nikhil Seetharam, Canadian composer
Nikhil Sharma, fictional character from the British TV soap opera Emmerdale
Nikhil Siddhartha, Telugu actor
Nikhil Srivastava, Indian scientist at the University of California, Berkeley
Nikhil Tandon, Indian professor of endocrinology at AIIMS, New Delhi
Nikhil Thakur, Indian Internet activist

See also
Nikki, similar name with Greek structure
Nickolas, another name with similar etymological structure

References